Hanson Australia is a premixed concrete, aggregates and precast company. Founded in 1949 as Pioneer Concrete and later re-branded to Pioneer International, it was taken over by Hanson in 1999.

History

In 1949, Pioneer Readymix was founded in St Peters, Sydney. In 1954 it was purchased by Tristan Antico and Kelvin Conley. In 1954 a concrete plant was acquired in Canberra. In 1959 it was listed on the Sydney Stock Market as a public company. As well as acquiring further concreting businesses, it diversified into building materials products.

In 1961, Pioneer purchased a pre-mix concrete plant in Hong Kong. In 1962, it commenced operations in the United Kingdom, followed in 1963 by Israel and 1964 by Italy. In 1965, it formed a joint venture with Shell Australia to enter the asphalt manufacture and supply industry. In the same year, the company diversified into aggregate quarrying in Hong Kong. In 1967, Pioneer acquired FW Williams Holdings that had plastic manufacturing operations and tea and coffee plantations in Papua New Guinea.

In 1970, Pioneer acquired pre-mix and quarrying companies in Spain and by the middle of the decade the company's interests had spread to Asia, Africa, and most of Europe. In 1973, in partnership with CSR, Pioneer acquired Australian & Kandos Cement Holdings.

In 1975, Pioneer diversified to invest heavily in resources in a joint project with Pennzoil. In 1978, Pioneer became involved in a major coal coking and steaming development in the Hunter Valley area of New South Wales in a joint venture with the Electricity Commission of New South Wales and Ampol. In 1979, Pioneer acquired a 20% stake in Ampol, which was increased to 65% in 1980. Ampol and Pioneer made further mineral acquisitions with uranium producers Nabarlek Uranium Mine and Queensland Mines.

In 1983, Pioneer purchased British building materials producer Mixconcrete followed in 1985 by Lone Star Industries' sand, gravel, and quarrying operations in the United States. In 1986 Pioneer was the subject of a hostile but ultimately unsuccessful takeover bid from FAI Insurance. In 1986, the building materials divisions in Italy, Portugal, and South Africa were sold. In 1987, mineral and gold producer Giant Resources was acquired. In 1988, the company changed its name to Pioneer International and gained full control of Ampol.

In 1995, Ampol merged with Caltex Australia to form Australian Petroleum, with Pioneer holding a 50% shareholding. In 1997, Pioneer planned to exit the petroleum industry via a "two-step" process. First, Pioneer sold its shareholding was sold to Caltex Australia in October 1997 in exchange for 90 million Caltex Australia shares (33% stake). Pioneer would then attempt to sell these Caltex Australia shares at a good price, which it eventually did through public offering in April 1998, allowing Pioneer to exit from the petroleum industry completely.

In 1998, Hymix Concrete was purchased. In 1999, Pioneer International was taken over by Hanson. It was rebranded as Hanson Australia in 2004.

As of 2018, Hanson operated 226 ready mix concrete plants and 75 aggregate operations.

References

External links

Building materials companies of Australia
Companies formerly listed on the Australian Securities Exchange
Manufacturing companies based in Sydney
1949 establishments in Australia